The DHL Fastest Lap Award is given annually by the courier, Formula One global partner and logistics provider DHL "to recognise the driver who most consistently demonstrates pure speed, with the fastest lap at the highest number of races each season", and to reward the winning driver for "characteristics such as excellent performance, passion, can-do attitude, reliability and precision". In the event of a tie, there is a countback and the driver with the highest number of second-fastest laps earns the award. If this is also tied, third-fastest laps are considered, and so on, until a winner is found. The trophy is presented to the winning driver at the final round of the season.

The inaugural winner was the Ferrari driver Kimi Räikkönen with six fastest laps in 2007. The award has been decided on a tiebreaker on four occasions. Räikkönen and his teammate Felipe Massa tied with six fastest laps and two-second-quickest laps in 2007 with the former winning by having more third-fastest laps than the latter. In , Red Bull Racing's Sebastian Vettel and his teammate Mark Webber had three fastest laps at the end of the season but Vettel won with two more second-fastest laps than the latter. In , both Hamilton and Red Bull's Max Verstappen set six fastest laps with Hamilton declared the winner for recording more second-fastest laps than Verstappen.

British drivers have won the award six times, German drivers four times, and Finnish racers three times. Mercedes have won on seven occasions to Red Bull Racing's five and Ferrari's three. The  recipient was Verstappen of the Red Bull Racing team with five fastest laps, his first time winning the award.

Winners

Statistics

See also
 DHL Fastest Pit Stop Award
 List of Formula One drivers who set a fastest lap

References

External links
 

Formula One
Auto racing trophies and awards
Fastest Lap Award
2007 establishments in Europe
2007 establishments in Asia
2007 establishments in Africa
2007 establishments in North America
2007 establishments in South America
2007 establishments in Oceania